The 1871 Connecticut gubernatorial election was held on April 3, 1871. It was the fourth consecutive contest between the same two major party nominees. Former governor and Republican nominee Marshall Jewell defeated incumbent governor and Democratic nominee James E. English with 50.05% of the vote.

The race was extremely close, with English finishing ahead in the initial count. However, a canvassing committee found a series of English's votes to be fraudulent and had errors that caused them to be disqualified. An investigation into the votes in Cheshire also added 23 votes to Jewell's total. These events placed Jewell ahead in the vote count with a majority. Jewell would be declared the winner and be seated as governor several days into the next term, and inaugurated governor on May 16, 1871.

General election

Candidates
Major party candidates
Marshall Jewell, Republican
James E. English, Democratic

Results

References

1871
Connecticut
Gubernatorial